Aloïse may refer to:

 Aloïse (film), 1975 French film
 Aloïse Corbaz, Swiss outside artist